The Lady of Lawers was possibly a Scottish soothsayer from the late 17th century. Her existence is disputed due to a lack of corroborating information.

The Lady of Lawers was Mary Campbell, daughter of Sir James Campbell, 4th of Lawers, and lived in a farm near Loch Tay, Perthshire. She married John Stewart of the Appin family in Argyllshire. She was always referred to as Baintighearn Labhuir, or the Lady of Lawers. Today Lawers is a small village between Killin and Kenmore on the A827, but the old village was set close beside Loch Tay and had a particular importance as the terminal for the ferry across the loch to Ardtalnaig on the southern shore. Even today, ruins of the old village may be seen together with the old church of Lawers. It was while this was being built that the Lady uttered the first of her prophecies: "The ridging stones shall never be placed on the roof of the church."

This was received with some amusement, as the carved capping stones had that day been brought by boat from Kenmore, but in the night a violent storm blew up and the stones were washed into the deep waters of the loch and could not be recovered.

From then on, the Lady of Lawers was regarded with a new respect and a certain fear. Close to the new church was planted an ash tree, beside which she was later buried. "The tree will grow",  said the Lady of Lawers, "and when it reaches the height of the gable the church will split asunder."

The church roof did indeed collapse in 1833, when it was said that the height of the tree reached that of the gable. Others linked the prophecy to the Great Disruption of 1843 when the congregation of Lawers left the Church of Scotland and formed the Free Church. There were two other prophesies concerning the ash tree. "When the tree reaches the ridge of the church the house of Balloch will be without an heir."  This happened in 1862 when the Marquis of Breadalbane died without an heir.

She also prophesied that anyone who damaged the tree that she had planted would meet a bad end: ""Evil will come to him who harms the ash tree." In the 1870s, even though he had been warned of the prophecy, local farmer John Campbell chopped it down. He was later gored to death by his own bull, his assistant went mad, and the horse, which pulled the farm cart, dropped down dead.

The Lady of Lawers made many predictions concerning the future conditions of Lochtayside. "There will be a mill on every stream and a plough on every field"  A hundred years later, flax growing had become an important industry in the district and there were flax mills in almost every stream that flowed into Loch Tay.

Her other prophesies were less optimistic but just as accurate. "The land will first be sifted and then riddled of its people."  "The jaw of the sheep will drive the plough from the ground."  "The homes on the Lochtayside will be so far apart that a cock will not hear its neighbour crow."  The Clearances reduced the population from around 3,500 to about 500 and the land was no longer cultivated but given over to flocks of sheep.

There were a number of predictions concerning the Breadalbanes. Few were very complimentary for she was no lover of the family. The final one said "The last laird will pass over Glenogle with a grey pony leaving nothing behind."  After the war, the Countess of Breadalbane, the last of the family, who had been living at Kinnell House beside Killin, finally sold it in 1948 and she indeed crossed Glenogle on her way to the station at Killin in a trap drawn by a grey pony. The last laird of Breadalbane had departed leaving nothing behind.

There are still three prophesies that remain unfulfilled:

 "A strange heir will come to Balloch when the Boar's Stone at Fearnan topples over."
 "A ship driven by smoke will sink in the loch with great loss of life." (indeed, for many years steam ships were used in Loch Tay, but there is no known record of a sinkage with large loss of lives)
 "The time will come when Ben Lawers will become so cold that it will chill and waste the land for seven miles."

References

17th-century Scottish women
People from Argyll and Bute
Scottish folklore